Logan Thompson (born February 25, 1997) is a Canadian professional ice hockey goaltender for the  Vegas Golden Knights of the National Hockey League (NHL). He previously played junior in the Western Hockey League (WHL) with the Brandon Wheat Kings.

Playing career

Junior, college, and minors
Thompson began in bantam junior hockey with the Calgary Bisons, before moving up to the midget level with the CBHA Blackhawks and Calgary Buffaloes of the Alberta Midget Hockey League. He split the 2014–15 season between the Grande Prairie Storm of the Alberta Junior Hockey League and the Brandon Wheat Kings of the Western Hockey League, appearing in 22 games for Grande Prairie and four for Brandon.

Thompson spent the next three seasons with Brandon, posting a career .905 save percentage and 3.36 goals against average with a 63–41–10 record, and helping the team to a WHL Championship in 2016. He then joined the Brock Badgers of U Sports' Ontario University Athletics (OUA) for the 2018–19 season, posting an 18–6–0 record, before joining the Adirondack Thunder of the ECHL on an amateur try-out contract in March 2019.

In April 2019, the Thunder released Thompson after eight appearances. Shortly afterwards, he signed a professional try-out contract with the Binghamton Devils of the American Hockey League (AHL), but appeared in just one game.

In May 2019, the Hershey Bears of the AHL signed Thompson to a one-year contract; however, he spent the entirety of the 2019–20 season with the Bears' ECHL affiliate, the South Carolina Stingrays.

Vegas Golden Knights (2021–present)
On July 13, 2020, Thompson signed a two-year entry-level contract with the Vegas Golden Knights of the NHL. Thompson started the 2021 season with the team's AHL affiliate, the Henderson Silver Knights, and was named AHL Goaltender of the Month for February. However, he was recalled to the main roster in early March, replacing previous backup Oscar Dansk. On March 11, 2021, Thompson made his NHL debut against the Minnesota Wild in relief of Marc-André Fleury, playing eight minutes and stopping both shots he faced in a 4–3 loss. Thompson was then sent back down to Henderson on March 16. Thompson was again named AHL Goaltender of the Month in March, and would ultimately win his first Aldege "Baz" Bastien Memorial Award as the AHL's best goaltender for the 2021 season; additionally, Thompson was named to the AHL's 2021 All-Rookie and Pacific Division All-Star teams.

Thompson made his first NHL start for Vegas on January 4, 2022, stopping 23 of 26 shots faced in a 3–2 loss to the Nashville Predators; in the process, Thompson became the first former U Sports goaltender to start an NHL game since George Maneluk for the New York Islanders in 1990. On January 30, the Golden Knights re-signed Thompson to a three-year, $2.3 million contract extension. Thompson recorded his first NHL win on February 20, 2022, making 35 saves on 36 shots in a 4–1 victory over the San Jose Sharks. He later recorded his first NHL shutout on March 30, 2022, stopping all 22 shots against in a 3–0 victory over the Seattle Kraken.

Due to injuries to starting goaltender Robin Lehner and backup Laurent Brossoit, Thompson was named the Golden Knights' starting goaltender entering the 2022–23 season, leading the team to a 4–3 victory over the Los Angeles Kings in the season opener on October 11, 2022. Thompson then recorded his first shutout of the season on October 13, stopping 27 shots as the Golden Knights defeated the Chicago Blackhawks 1–0.

Thompson was named NHL Rookie of the Month for November 2022, after winning eight of ten appearances during the month. Subsequently, he was named to his first NHL All-Star Game in early January, serving as one of the Pacific Division's goaltenders in the 2023 contest; Thompson also became the first rookie goaltender to be named to the All-Star Game since John Gibson in 2016.

International play

Thompson was named to the Canadian national team for the 2022 IIHF World Championship, ultimately winning the silver medal.

Career statistics

Regular season and playoffs

International

Awards and honours

References

External links
 
 IIHF World Championship statistics at IIHF

1997 births
Living people
Adirondack Thunder players
Binghamton Devils players
Brandon Wheat Kings players
Brock Badgers ice hockey players
Canadian ice hockey goaltenders
Grande Prairie Storm players
Henderson Silver Knights players
National Hockey League All-Stars
South Carolina Stingrays players
Ice hockey people from Calgary
Undrafted National Hockey League players
Vegas Golden Knights players